Bahet Corona is a corona on the surface of Venus. Both features are surrounded by a ring of ridges and troughs, which in places cut more radially-oriented fractures. The centers of the features also contain radial fractures as well as volcanic domes and flows. Coronae are thought to form due to the upwelling of hot material from deep in the interior of Venus. The two coronae may have formed at the same time over a single upwelling, or may indicate movement of the upwelling or the upper layers of the planet to the west over time. A 'pancake' dome, similar to low-relief domes see in the southern hemisphere, is located just to the southwest of Bahet.

References

Surface features of Venus